Ali Mohamed Zaid Al-Sadah is a Qatari football midfielder who played for Qatar at the 1984 Summer Olympics and the 1984 AFC Asian Cup finals.

Al-Sadah appeared in Qatar's four 1984 AFC Asian Cup group stage matches, and scored a goal in his side's 1–1 draw with Saudi Arabia.

International goals

References

External links
Profile at Sports-reference.com
Stats

Qatar international footballers
Qatari footballers
Olympic footballers of Qatar
Footballers at the 1984 Summer Olympics
1984 AFC Asian Cup players
1961 births
Living people
Al-Arabi SC (Qatar) players
Qatar Stars League players
Association football midfielders